Chah Kandar (also Romanized as Chāh Kandar and Chāh-e Kandār; also known as Chāh-e Kandeh and Chāh Kandeh) is a village in Kuhestan Rural District, Rostaq District, Darab County, Fars Province, Iran. At the 2006 census, its population was 157, in 31 families.

References 

Populated places in Darab County